Chegireddi Ghanapuram or Chegireddy Ghanpur is a village and Gram panchayat in Jilled Chowdergudem mandal of Ranga Reddy district, Telangana, India.

Demographics
According to Indian census, 2001, the demographic details of Chegireddy Ghanpur village is as follows:
 Total Population: 	1,253 in 245 Households
 Male Population: 	629 and Female Population: 	624
 Children Under 6-years of age: 255 (Boys - 	140 and Girls -	115)
 Total Literates: 	316

References

 Villages in Ranga Reddy district